Fustiñana is a town and municipality located in the province and autonomous community of Navarre, northern Spain.

Symbols

Coat of Arms 
Fustiñana's coat of arms is silver with the cross of San Juan of Jerusalem in gold. This coat of arms appears on the municipal flag, alongside Navarre's coat of arms.

Monuments 
Fustiaña's most prominent monuments are two churches, the parish dedicated to Nuestra Señora de la Asunción in the town itself, and the Ermita de Santa Lucía, located at the foot of the Bardenas Reales.

References

External links
 FUSTIÑANA in the Bernardo Estornés Lasa - Auñamendi Encyclopedia, Euskomedia Fundazioa 
 Ayuntamiento de Fustiñana (In Spanish)
 Wikimedia Commons has a multimedia category for Fustiñana

Municipalities in Navarre